Polymnia Saregkou (born 11 May 1972) is a Greek former basketball player who competed in the 2004 Summer Olympics.

References

1972 births
Living people
Greek women's basketball players
Greek expatriate basketball people in Spain
Olympic basketball players of Greece
Basketball players at the 2004 Summer Olympics
Basketball players from Thessaloniki